Dharmapala Kamboja was probably the last ruler of Kamboja Pala dynasty of Bengal. He ruled Dandabhukti-mandala in Vardhamana-bhukti in the first quarter of eleventh century and was contemporary of Rajendra Chola (reign 1012-1044) of Chola dynasty of Deccan.

One king named Dharmapala ruling in Dandabhukti finds mention in the Tirmulai Inscription of Rajendra Chola which he issued in his 13th regnal year (about 1025 AD). Scholars identify this Dharmapala of the Tirmulai Inscription with the Dharmapala of the Kamboja-Pala Dynasty ruling in Dandabhukti in the first quarter of the 11th century. It has also been suggested that when threatened by Pala rulers of Bengal, Dharmapala, this last ruler of the Kamboja-Pala Dynasty of Bengal, might have sought help from Rajendra Chola of the Chola Dynasty.
Chidambaram Inscription Tamil language, found in Chidambaram refers to one Kamboja (Kambosha-raja) ruler who made a beautiful stone gift as a curio (katchi) to (Kulotunga) Rajendrasoladevar (i.e. Rajendra Chola) which with latter's permission, was embedded in front row of the edirambalam of the Nataraja temple:

Rajendra sola devarku Kambosha-rajan katchiyaaga kattina kallu, idu
udaiyar rajendra sola devar tiruvaai molindaruli udaiyar
tiruchrirramblam udaiyar koyilil mun vaittadu indakkallu tiruvedir
ambalattu tiru kkai sarattil tiru mum pattikku melai ppattiyille vaittadu.

Though  K. A.  Nilakanta Sastri links Kamboja king of Chidambram inscription to Cambodia (Kampuchea). Many other scholars say that Kamboja of Chidambram inscriptions is this Dharampala of Kamboj lineage who was ruling in Dandbhukti-mandala of west Bengal during early 11th century and was therefore a contemporary of Rajendra Chola.

Karandai (Tanjavur or Tanjore) plates (v.48) (Sanggham Copper Plate Charter) of about 1020 issued by Rajendra Chola (c. 1012 - 1044) in the eighth year of his reign states that a Kamboja king solicited  friendship of Rajendra Chola by sending him for the protection of his royalty (atmalaksmim) a victorious war-chariot with which he (Kamboja king) had defeated the armies which opposed him in battle. The inscription issued  in the eighth year of his reign (1020) contains  a significant verse in its separate Sanskrit section and it refers to one Kamboja Raja:
Kamboja-rajo ripu-raja sena-jaitrena yen= ajayad=ahaveshu |
tarn prahinot prartthita-mitra-bhavo yennai ratham ||.

The above inscription says that, in order to seek Chola's friendship, Kamboja king presented to Rajendra Chola a chariot with which he (Kamboja raja) had won his enemies in many battles.

The Kamboja king mentioned in the Karandai (Tanjavur or Tanjore) plates (v.48)  is also believed to be Dharmapala of the Kamboja-Pala Dynasty of Bengal. There can also be no doubt that Dharmapala of the Tirumalai Inscription of king Rajendra Chola is the Kamboja king Dharmapala of Dandabhukti who was a scion of the Kamboja dynasty to which Nayapalaa, Narayanapala and Rajyapala of the Irda Copper Plate grant and the Kalanda Copper Plate grant belonged.

When threatened by the Pala ruler Mahpala-I, this Kamboja Dharmapala appears to have sought friendship and help with Rajendra Chola against the Pala ruler by forming an alliance with Rajendra Chola and presenting him a valuable Ratha (Chariot) as a token of friendship.  As a consequence, Rajendra Chola led his victorious northern expedition to the banks of the Ganges and also met Dharmapala in Dandabhukti. This demonstrates Kamboja rulers' weakened position and Rajendra Chola's political influence in Bengal. Some scholars, however, think that “Kamboja king sent his ratha as a friendly present to Rajendra Chola to avoid war with the latter".

References

People from West Bengal
Kambojas